The Lone Hand is a 1922 American silent Western film directed by B. Reeves Eason and featuring Hoot Gibson. It is not known whether the film currently survives, which suggests that it is a lost film.

Plot
As described in a film magazine, hard punching Wyoming cowpuncher Laramie Lad (Gibson) decides to take a well-earned vacation and visit an old friend who runs a summer camp for city folks. On the way his horse drops in its tracks and Laramie is forced to proceed on foot. He runs into a shooting affair and learns that a young woman named Jane (Daw) and her aged father Al Sheridan (Welsh) are in distress, victims of a swindler's ruse to defraud them of their mining property. Abandoning his vacation plans, the cowpuncher sets about foiling the plans of the crooks. Al is captured by the plotters who try to force from him the location of the secret entrance to the mine. Al escapes after several hours of torture and, thinking that the mine is his only haven of safety, he makes it to the bottom of the shaft before he lapses into unconsciousness. When the mine starts to flood Laramie, learning of the old man's plight, rescues him without a moment too loose. The crooks are brought to justice, Laramie puts the mine on a paying basis, and winds things up in a satisfactory manner when he wins Jane and his first vacation turns into a honeymoon.

Cast
 Hoot Gibson as Laramie Lad (credited as Ed "Hoot" Gibson)
 Marjorie Daw as Jane Sheridan
 Helen Holmes as Margie Vanney
 Hayden Stevenson as Buck
 Jack Pratt as Jack Maltrain
 William Welsh as Al Sheridan (credited as William Welch)
 Bob Kortman as Curley (credited as Robert Kortman)
 Esther Ralston

See also
 Hoot Gibson filmography

References

External links
 
 

1922 films
1922 Western (genre) films
American black-and-white films
Films directed by B. Reeves Eason
Silent American Western (genre) films
Universal Pictures films
1920s American films
1920s English-language films